Jan Kilian (1953 – 28 November 2020) was a Polish politician who served as a member of the Sejm.

References

1953 births
2020 deaths
Polish politicians